The Hughes 393 (sometimes referred to as the HS-393) is a communications satellite bus introduced in 1985 by Hughes Space and Communications Company. It was a spin-stabilized bus that had twice as much power as the HS-376 platform.

Design 
The satellite bus was designed and manufactured by Hughes.

Its power system generated approximately 2,350 watts of power at beginning of life and 2,200 at end of life, thanks to two cylindrical solar panels. These panels used K7 and K4-3/4 solar cells, with more than twice the number of cells than on the HS-376. The bottom panel was retracted around the body and top panel for launch, and extended downwards for operation. It also had two 38 Ah NiH2 batteries.

It also had two axial and four radial  bipropellant thrusters for station-keeping and attitude control. It included enough propellant for orbit circularization and 8 years of operation.

Its payload was composed of a  antenna that fed Ku band transponders.

Satellites 
The HS-393 was a more powerful platform than the HS-376, being able to supply 2,200 kW of power versus the 1,400 kW of the HS-376HP. Only three were ever built.

See also

 Boeing 601
 Boeing Satellite Development Center

References 

Satellite buses